The Quetta women's cricket team is the women's representative cricket team for Quetta. They competed in the National Women's Cricket Championship between 2004–05 and 2017.

History
Quetta joined the National Women's Cricket Championship for its inaugural season in 2004–05, losing to Lahore in the initial knock-out stage. The side went on to compete in every edition of the National Women's Cricket Championship until it ended in 2017, but never made it out of the initial group stage. Their best finish came in the 2012–13 season, when they won two matches to finish second in Pool B Group 2.

Players

Notable players
Players who played for Quetta and played internationally are listed below, in order of first international appearance (given in brackets):

 Nahida Khan (2009)

Seasons

National Women's Cricket Championship

See also
 Quetta cricket team

References

Women's cricket teams in Pakistan
Cricket in Quetta